The Tatra T816 is a truck family, produced by Czech company Tatra. It uses the traditional tatra concept of rigid backbone tube and swinging half-axles giving independent suspension. The vehicles are available in 4x4, 6x6, 8x8, 10x8, 10x10, 12x8 and 12x12 variants. The truck was developed from the model T815 to comply with the most demanding off-road conditions. Originally the T816 range was developed for the purposes of military, however today also civilian applications are available (notably as heavy off-road firefighting trucks.

The T816 family has two categories. The T816 Armax range, which is more similar to the civilian T815 TERRN°1 range, but optimised for military use. The T816 Force range offers the heaviest trucks customized for the respective military customers. While the Armax range uses Tatra air-cooled engines and gearboxes, the Force uses water-cooled engines and gearboxes of other manufacturers.

816
Cars of the Czech Republic
Military trucks
All-wheel-drive vehicles